Island is a 2022 South Korean web series starring Kim Nam-gil, Lee Da-hee, Cha Eun-woo, and Sung Joon. Part 1 of the series premiered on TVING and Amazon Prime Video on December 30, 2022 and later aired on tvN on February 10, 2023, every Friday and Saturday at 22:10 (KST). The Part 2 of the drama premiered on February 24, 2023.

Synopsis
Set on Jeju Island, three people fight against evil that is trying to destroy the world.

Cast

Main
 Kim Nam-gil as Van
 Kim Seo-joon as young Van
 Lee Da-hee as Won Mi-ho / Wonjeong
 Park Seo-gyeong as young Wonjeong / Won Mi-ho
 Cha Eun-woo as Priest Johan
 Ki Eun-yoo as young Priest Johan
 Sung Joon as Gungtan
 Kim Min-jun as young Gungtan

Supporting

Granny Haenyeo’s Home 
 Go Doo-shim as Geum Baek-ju
 Heo Jung-hee as Boo Yeom-ji
 Kwon Ye-eun as young Boo Yeom-ji

Daehan Group 

 Jeon Kuk-hwan as Won Tae-han
 Oh Kwang-rok as Butler Jang
 Lee Soon-won as Secretary Kang

Jijangjong 
 Park Geun-hyung as Jongryeong
 Keum Kwang-san as monk
 Kang Hyun-joong as monk
 Kim Jin-man as monk

Tamra High School 

 Kim Ki-cheon as Principal Lee San-il
 Yoo Seung-ok as Han Su-jin
 Jung Soo-bin as Lee Su-ryun

Others 
Yoo Yi-jun as Kyung-jun  
Jeon Ji-hwan  
Kim Sung-oh as Yul

Special appearance 
 Choi Tae-joon as Kang Chan-hee
 Kim Min-jun as groom

Production
Filming was scheduled to start in October 2021.

On December 20, 2021, it was reported that actress Lee Da-hee was injured while filming. Later in the day, the actress's agency confirmed that she suffered a neck injury.

On May 24, 2022, actor Cha Eun-woo posted a photo on SNS saying that his part had finished filming.

Release
The series was originally made available for streaming through TVING and Amazon Prime Video. On February 10, 2023, Island Part 1 was premiered on tvN. The Part 2 was available to stream on TVING from February 24.

Viewership

Notes

References

External links
  
 
 

TVING original programming
Korean-language television shows
2022 South Korean television series debuts
2023 South Korean television series endings
Television series by Studio Dragon
Television shows based on South Korean webtoons
South Korean fantasy television series
South Korean action television series